Zied Boughattas (born 25 December 1990) is a Tunisian footballer who plays for ENPPI as a centre back.

Club career 
Boughattas played for Étoile Sportive du Sahel from 2011 to 2020. In November 2020, he joined ENPPI on a three-year deal.

International career 
Zied Boughattas has joined to the Tunisian national team during the 2016 African Nations Championship. His international debut was against Morocco in June 2015.

References

External links
 

1990 births
Living people
Tunisian footballers
2017 Africa Cup of Nations players
Association football defenders
Étoile Sportive du Sahel players
Tunisia international footballers
Tunisian Ligue Professionnelle 1 players
Egyptian Premier League players
Expatriate footballers in Egypt
Tunisian expatriate footballers
Tunisian expatriate sportspeople in Egypt
ENPPI SC players
Tunisia A' international footballers
2016 African Nations Championship players